The Alfa Romeo Sportut is a concept car designed by Bertone for the Italian automobile manufacturer Alfa Romeo. It was based on an Alfa Romeo 145 platform and first shown at the 1997 Geneva Motor Show as a non-moving styling exercise. 

The vehicle's body style is a four-door SUV, with hidden rear door-handles like the Alfa Romeo 156.

Technical Specifications

Engine: 4 cylinders in-line, 4 valves per cylinder, Twin Spark
configuration: front transverse
displacement: 1970 cc
power: 
chassis: 
transmission: 4WD
gearbox: 5-speed manual

References 

Sportut
Bertone concept vehicles
All-wheel-drive vehicles
Cars introduced in 1997